Didier Bourdon (born 23 January 1959) is a French actor, screenwriter and film director.

He first reached stardom in France when he created the comedic trio Les Inconnus with Bernard Campan and Pascal Légitimus, which was very popular throughout the 1990s.

Theatre

Filmography

References

External links

 
 Some Place Else at Eurochannel

1959 births
Living people
French male film actors
French film directors
French humorists
French male screenwriters
French screenwriters
20th-century French male actors
21st-century French male actors
Lycée Hoche alumni
French National Academy of Dramatic Arts alumni